Álvaro Díaz Cebrián (born 7 August 2003) is a Spanish professional motorcycle racer. He is currently competes in the Supersport World Championship with Arco YART Yamaha WorldSSP. He won the Spanish Supersport 300 Championship in 2021 and the Supersport 300 World Championship in 2022.

Career

Early career
Díaz began his career in the challenge80 class of the Spanish RFME 2015 championship, moving to PreMoto3 in 2016. In 2017, he participated in the Spanish Supersport 300 championship (consisting of three races) with a Kawasaki Ninja 300 of the ETG Racing team. He took part in only one race and finished fourth, finishing eighth in the championship. In 2018 he continued to compete in the SSP 300 (eight races passed), switching to the Yamaha YZF-R3 of the Arco Motor University Team, with which he finished in 13th final position, with a sixth place as his best result in the race. In 2019, still in Supersport 300 (SBK junior) with the same bike and team as last year, he obtained two third places and finished the season in sixth place in the standings.

Supersport 300 World Championship
In 2020, Díaz made his Supersport 300 World Championship debut with the Biblion MotoXRacing Yamaha team. In race 1 of the opening round, he finished eighth, achieving his best finish of the season. He finished the season in 21st position with 20 points. In the same year, he also participated in five races (out of the thirteen scheduled) of the Spanish SSP 300 championship, obtaining a second and a third place and finishing in eighth place overall.

In 2021, Díaz returned full-time to the Spanish SSP 300 championship, taking the national title with six victories and ten podiums overall from a total of fourteen races. In the same year he also took part in four races of the world championship as a wildcard. In the Catalunya round with the Yamaha MS Racing team, he finished in fifth place in race 1 and scored his first podium in race 2, a second place, as well as setting the fastest lap. In the subsequent Jerez round held with the Arco-Motor University Team, Díaz finished fifth in both races, however suffering a disqualification in race 2 for irresponsible driving. He finished the season in 19th position with 42 points.

In 2022 he returned to the Supersport 300 World Championship as the only regular driver of the Arco Motor University Team. In the inaugural Aragon round, Díaz took second place in race 1 and scored his first victory in race 2, topping a world championship standings for the first time. He maintained the leadership of the championship for almost the entire season, sometimes alternating with his compatriot Marc García, and with eleven podium finishes including two victories, he won the sixth edition of the Supersport 300 World Championship.

Career statistics

Supersport 300 World Championship

Races by year
(key)

Supersport World Championship

Races by year
(key) (Races in bold indicate pole position; races in italics indicate fastest lap)

 Season still in progress.

References

External links

2003 births
Living people
Sportspeople from Valencia
Spanish motorcycle racers
Spanish sportsmen
Supersport 300 World Championship riders
Supersport World Championship riders